Almogaver is an extinct possible odd-toed ungulate genus in the family Phenacodontidae. It was a ground-dwelling herbivore. It is known from the Tremp Basin in Spain, and some authorities consider it synonymous with Phenacodus.

References 

Condylarths
Paleocene mammals of Europe
Paleogene Spain
Fossils of Spain
Fossil taxa described in 1954
Nomina dubia
Prehistoric placental genera